Gentian Hajdari (born 1 April 1975 in Albania) is a  former Albanian footballer. The defender retired at the end of the 2007–2008 season after having spent his career at Dinamo Tirana and SK Tirana.

External links
 

1975 births
Living people
Albanian footballers
Association football defenders
FK Dinamo Tirana players
KF Tirana players
Kategoria Superiore players